DataSheets.com is a searchable database of electronic component data sheets and purchasing information.  The website is intended for Design engineers and Electronics purchasing agents. DataSheets.com was developed by UBM in conjunction with SiliconExpert Technologies.

See also
 data sheet
 Electronic component
 Electronics

References

Internet properties established in 2011